John Kinzie may refer to:

John Kinzie, early Chicago settler
John H. Kinzie, his son, and early Chicago village president
John Kinzie Clark, early Lake County, Illinois settler